This is a list of notable Pieds-Noirs (French pronunciation: [pjenwaʁ], Black-Foot), a term referring to French citizens who lived in French Algeria before independence, from 1830 to 1962. Specifically, Pieds-Noirs include those of European settlers descent from France or other European countries (such as Spain, Italy and Malta), who were born in Algeria.

French Algeria (1830–1962)

 Louis Althusser, philosopher
 Jacques Attali, economist
 Daniel Auteuil, actor and director
 Édouard-Henri Avril, painter and illustrator
 Jean-Pierre Bacri, actor
 Guy Bedos, comedian
 Paul Belmondo, sculptor
 Pierre Bensusan, guitarist
 Fernand Bonnier de La Chapelle, resistant
 Patrick Bruel, singer
 Albert Camus, philosopher
 Marie Cardinal, writer
 Léon Cauvy, painter
 Marcel Cerdan, boxer
 Alain Chabat, comedian
 Hélène Cixous, philosopher
 Claude Cohen-Tannoudji, physicist (Nobel Prize winner 1997)
 Étienne Daho, singer
 Jacques Derrida, philosopher
 Marcel Deviq, engineer, businessman, and politician
 Julien Dray, politician
 Edwige Fenech, actress
 Louis Franchet d'Espèrey, soldier
 Dinh Gilly, operatic baritone
 José Gonzalez (French politician), politician
 Roger Hanin, actor
 Marlène Jobert, actress
 Edmond Jouhaud, soldier
 Alphonse Juin, soldier
 Gaston Julia, mathematician
 Enrico Macias, singer
 Jean Pélégri, writer
 Michèle Perret, linguistics professor and writer of fiction
 Polaire, (Émilie Marie Bouchaud), actress and singer
 Paul Quilès, politician
 Stéphane Rambaud, politician
 Emmanuel Roblès, writer
 Beatrice Romand, actress
 Yves Saint Laurent, designer
 Jean Sénac, poet
 Benjamin Stora, historian
 François Valéry, singer
 Zouzou, model and singer

French protectorate of Morocco (1912–1956)

 Jean-Paul Bertrand-Demanes, footballer
 Frida Boccara, singer
 Laurence de Cambronne, journalist
 Jean-Charles de Castelbajac, designer
 Just Fontaine, footballer
 Roland Giraud, actor
 Élisabeth Guigou, politician
 Michel Jobert, politician
 Jean-Luc Mélenchon, politician
 Macha Méril, actress
 Philippe Morillon, military
 Daniel Pennac, writer
 Dominique de Villepin, politician
 Jean Reno, actor

French protectorate of Tunisia (1881–1956)

 Serge Adda, businessman
 Serge Bramly, writer
 Claudia Cardinale, actress
 Paul Chemla, bridge player
 Pierre Darmon, tennis player
 Bertrand Delanoë, politician
 Élie Lellouche, horse trainer
 Pierre Lellouche, politician
 Albert Memmi, writer
 Nine Moati, writer
 Serge Moati, journalist
 Edgard Pisani, politician
 Jean Sassi, military
 Philippe Séguin, politician
 Joseph Sitruk, rabbi
 Georges Wolinski, cartoonist

References 

French Algeria
Pieds-Noirs